Okuyama (written: 奥山) is a Japanese surname. Notable people with the surname include:

Emiko Okuyama (born 1951), Japanese politician
Hisashi Okuyama (born 1941), Japanese poet
, Japanese model
, Japanese sport wrestler
Ken Okuyama (born 1959), Japanese industrial designer
, Japanese footballer
, Japanese footballer
, Japanese animator
Takemasa Okuyama (born 1944), Canadian karateka
, Japanese footballer
, Japanese footballer
, Japanese footballer

Japanese-language surnames